The 2013 Buffalo Funds - NAIA Division I men's basketball tournament was held in March at Municipal Auditorium in Kansas City, Missouri. The 76th annual NAIA basketball tournament features 32 teams playing in a single-elimination format. The opening game started on March 13, and the National Championship Game was played on March 19.

Awards and honors
Leading scorer:
Leading rebounder:
Player of the Year:
Most consecutive tournament appearances: 22nd, Georgetown (KY)
Most tournament appearances: 32nd, Georgetown (KY)

2013 NAIA bracket

  * denotes overtime.

See also
2013 NAIA Division I women's basketball tournament
2013 NCAA Division I men's basketball tournament
2013 NCAA Division II men's basketball tournament
2013 NCAA Division III men's basketball tournament
2013 NAIA Division II men's basketball tournament

References

NAIA Men's Basketball Championship
Tournament
NAIA Division I men's basketball tournament
NAIA Division I men's basketball tournament